Chaungywa is a village in Singu Township, Pyinoolwin District, Mandalay Division, Myanmar. 

It is a riverside town located by the Irrawaddy about 2 km south of Singu.

References 

Populated places in Mandalay Region